Ossimo is a town and comune in the province of Brescia, Lombardy, northern Italy. It is part of Val Camonica, and is divided into two centers: Ossimo Superiore and Ossimo Inferiore.

It can be reached by the provincial road 5, that leads from Malegno to Borno.

References

Cities and towns in Lombardy